Holborn Library is a public library in Theobalds Road, Holborn, in the London Borough of Camden.

The library is operated by the Camden London Borough Council and also houses the Local Studies and Archives Centre for the borough.

The Twentieth Century Society describe it as "a milestone in the history of the modern public library".

References

Library buildings completed in 1960
Buildings and structures in Holborn
Public libraries in London